The 1976 San Francisco State Gators football team represented San Francisco State University as a member of the Far Western Conference (FWC) during the 1976 NCAA Division II football season. Led by 16th-year head coach Vic Rowen, San Francisco State compiled an overall record of 4–7 with a mark of 2–3 in conference play, placing in a three-way tie for third place in the FWC. For the season the team was outscored by its opponents 179 to 130. The Gators played home games at Cox Stadium in San Francisco.

Schedule

References

San Francisco State
San Francisco State Gators football seasons
San Francisco State Gators football